Nokia Networks (formerly Nokia Solutions and Networks (NSN) and Nokia Siemens Networks (NSN)) is a multinational data networking and telecommunications equipment company headquartered in Espoo, Finland, and wholly owned subsidiary of Nokia Corporation. It started as a joint venture between Nokia of Finland and Siemens of Germany known as Nokia Siemens Networks. Nokia Networks has operations in around 120 countries. In 2013, Nokia acquired 100% of Nokia Networks, buying all of Siemens' shares. In April 2014, the NSN name was phased out as part of a rebranding process.

History

The company was created as the result of a joint venture between Siemens Communications (minus its Enterprise business unit) and Nokia's Network Business. The formation of the company was publicly announced on 19 June 2006. Nokia Siemens Networks was officially launched at the 3GSM World Congress in Barcelona in February 2007. Nokia Siemens Networks then began full operations on 1 April 2007 and has its headquarters in Espoo, Greater Helsinki, Finland.

In January 2008 Nokia Siemens Networks acquired Israeli company Atrica, a company that builds carrier-class Ethernet transport systems for metro networks. The official release did not disclose terms, however they are thought to be in the region of $100 million. In February 2008 Nokia Siemens Networks acquired Apertio, a Bristol, UK-based mobile network customer management tools provider, for €140 million. With this acquisition Nokia Siemens Networks gained customers in the subscriber management area including Orange, T-Mobile, O2, Vodafone, and Hutchison 3G.

In 2009, according to Siemens, Siemens only retained a non-controlling financial interest in NSN, with the day-to-day operations residing with Nokia.

On 19 July 2010, Nokia Siemens Networks announced it would acquire the wireless-network equipment of Motorola. The acquisition was completed on 29 April 2011 for $975 million in cash. As of the transaction approximately 6,900 employees transferred to Nokia Siemens Networks.

On 23 November 2011, Nokia Siemens Networks announced that it would refocus its business on mobile broadband equipment, the fastest-growing segment of the market. This refocus resulted in the restructuring of the company and the planned layoffs of 17,000 employees. The plan reduced the company's work force by 23% from its 2011 level of 74,000, and helped the company trim annual operating expenses by $1.35 billion by the end of 2013.

On 12 December 2011, ADTRAN, Inc. announced it would acquire Nokia Siemens Networks fixed line Broadband Access business. This caused around 400 jobs to move to ADTRAN as part of the deal.

After the restructuring process, Nokia Siemens Networks brought in a positive turn around to its businesses. The bottom line and operating margins rose to approximately 10%, which was a significant shift from the previous sub-zero margins, with positive cash flows for six continuous quarters.

On 7 August 2013, Nokia completed the acquisition of Siemens' stake in the company and rebranded as Nokia Solutions and Networks. After this acquisition NSN became a fully owned subsidiary of Nokia.

On 29 April 2014, Nokia announced that NSN would henceforth be known as Nokia Networks. It was also announced that Rajeev Suri, the CEO of NSN would be appointed as president and CEO of Nokia Corporation, effective 1 May 2014.

On 15 April 2015, Nokia announced its intent to purchase Alcatel-Lucent for €15.6 billion in an all-stock deal. The acquisition aimed to create a stronger competitor to the rival firms Ericsson and Huawei, whom Nokia and Alcatel-Lucent had surpassed in terms of total combined revenue in 2014. The acquisition was expected to be completed in early 2016, and was subject to regulatory and shareholder approval. Regulatory approval was obtained in October 2015 and shareholder approval was announced on 4 January 2016.

On 3 November 2016, Nokia completed the acquisition of Alcatel-Lucent and it was merged into their Nokia Networks division.

On 1 August 2020, Pekka Lundmark took over the role of CEO of Nokia.

Logos

See also

List of networking hardware vendors

References

External links
Nokia Networks

Finnish companies established in 2007
Nokia assets
Nokia services
Siemens
Telecommunications equipment vendors
VoIP companies
Electronics companies established in 2007
Telecommunications companies established in 2007